Siddhwat temple is located at Bhairavgarh, Ujjain (MP), India at the banks of Shipra river. This temple is also known as Shaktibhed shrine. The glory of this place has been described in the Hindu mythology. There are three types of accomplishment here: child, property and virtuousness. Pooja is done here for getting all three. Rituals are done for Sadgati i.e. the Ancestors. People used to tie a thread on the Banyan tree for property i.e. Lakshmi work and Reverse Satiya (Swastik) is made for the attainment of a child, i.e. son. The Bhairvgarh village near Siddhwat is famous for its tie and dye painting for centuries.

Hindu temples in Madhya Pradesh
Ujjain district